Oleksiy Butovsky Vorskla Stadium is a multi-purpose stadium in Poltava, Ukraine. It is currently used mostly for football matches, and is the home of FC Vorskla Poltava. The stadium holds 24,795 people.

History
It was built in 1974 and has undergone several reconstructions after, most notably in 2000, when the facade of the stadium was renovated. In 2008, the most notable feature of the restoration was the installation of a coloured screen. The renovation was done for the Ukrainian Super Cup, which was played at the stadium. The cup has traveled outside of Odessa for the first time due to renovation works at Chornomorets Stadium, the annual venue for the title game. In 2006, the stadium was renamed in honor of Oleksiy Butovsky.

Gallery

References

External links
 Pylypchuk, B. ''How comfortable is to attend the UPL games: Butovskyi Vorskla Stadium (Наскільки комфортно ходити на матчі УПЛ: стадіон Ворскла ім. Олексія Бутовського). Football 24. 10 May 2018

Sports venues built in the Soviet Union
Football venues in Poltava Oblast
Multi-purpose stadiums in Ukraine
Sports venues in Poltava
Sports venues completed in 1951
Kolos (sports society)